Balfour Mews is a mews in Mayfair, London, England. It runs from Aldford Street to South Street.

Mayfair
Mews streets in London
Streets in the City of Westminster